Johnsontown may refer to several places in the United States:

Johnsontown (Atlanta), a historical settlement in what is now the Buckhead Community of Atlanta, Georgia
Johnsontown, Louisville, Kentucky
Johnsontown, New York
Johnsontown, Virginia
Johnsontown, Berkeley County, West Virginia
Johnsontown, Jefferson County, West Virginia

See also
Johnstown (disambiguation)